Prewar Gibson banjos were made in the years before World War 2. They are differentiated from later Gibson banjos by their scarcity. Banjo sales plummeted during the Great Depression, for lack of buyers, and metal parts became scarce into the 1940s as factories shifted to support the war. As parts became scarce, non-standard versions came out, made from a variety of leftover parts, called floor sweep models.

Terminology

Although this term normally refers to World War II, when used to describe Gibson banjos, the term prewar operationally refers to banjos made prior to 1947.  Production of metal banjo parts was suspended during World War II.  However, small numbers of Gibson banjos continued to be constructed and shipped during the war years using stocks of metal parts remaining in factory bins. For that reason, Gibson banjos produced between 1940 and 1945 often reflect the creativity of shop personnel rather than standard catalogue descriptions. Production of metal banjo parts resumed in the Fall of 1946; however, it is commonly believed that the metal composition of foundry products delivered to Gibson after World War II was inferior to that of parts produced prior to 1940.  On April 12, 1947, the Gibson Instrument Company changed their corporate logo from script lettering to the use of block letters, and this change occurred sufficiently close to resumption of banjo output to allow easy identification of prewar and postwar Gibson instruments.

References

External links
Spann's Guide to Gibson 1902-1941 is a, "detailed look at the inner workings of the famous musical instrument manufacturer of Kalamazoo, Michigan before World War II." (back of cover)

Gibson Brands